Swami Balanandacharya was a Vaishnav saint of Ramanandi Sampradaya.

References

Indian Hindu spiritual teachers
Indian Vaishnavites
Vaishnava saints
Bhakti movement